On 6 December 2022 a bomb blast killed at least 7 and injured 6 people in Mazar-i-Sharif, Afghanistan. The explosion was reportedly caused by a mine planted on the side of the road.

References

Mass murder in 2022
2022 murders in Afghanistan
21st century in Balkh Province
Crime in Balkh Province
21st-century mass murder in Afghanistan
Mazar-i-Sharif
December 2022 crimes in Asia
Terrorist incidents in Afghanistan in 2022
December 2022 events in Afghanistan